Kanamori (written: 金森 "money/metal, forest", or 金守 "money/metal, protect") is a Japanese surname. Notable people with the surname include:

, Japanese-born American mathematician
, Japanese seismologist
, Japanese-born Australian photographer
, Japanese samurai and daimyō
, Japanese politician
, Japanese footballer

See also
, Sengoku period Japanese clan
Kanamori–McAloon theorem, mathematical logic theorem

Japanese-language surnames